Ultras are organised groups of association football fans.

Ultras may also refer to:
 Ultras (comics), a fictional superhuman species from the Ultraverse by Malibu Comics
 Ultras (Malaysia), Malay racial extremists during the 1960s
 Ultras or ultra-leftists, a pejorative term used by Marxist–Leninists to describe others on the far-left with positions they deem to be extreme or uncompromising
 Ultras or Fire-Eaters, a group of secessionists who emerged during the Compromise of 1850
 Ultras, a fictional political party in favour of radical population control in the Isaac Asimov novelette The Key (short story)
 Ultra-royalist, a French parliamentary faction in the early 19th century
 Ultra-Tories, a section of the Tory party that broke away after the Catholic Relief Act of 1829
 Ultramarathon, a footrace that is longer than the traditional marathon length of 42.2 km (26.2 mi)
 Ultra prominent peak, a mountain summit with topographic prominence greater than 1,500 meters
 Groups militantly opposed to Algerian independence during the Algerian War, such as the Organisation armée secrète (OAS)

See also
 Ultra (disambiguation)